Ana Maslać Plenković (born 19 December 1979) is a Croatian jurist who is the wife of Andrej Plenković, the Prime Minister of Croatia, a position he has held since 19 October 2016. She was the Head of the Human Resources and Legal Service of the Croatian Parliament.

Personal life
Ana Maslać was born in Dubrovnik and is of Herzegovinian descent. In 2014, she married Andrej Plenković, then an MEP. The couple have three children: Mario (b. 2014), Mila (b. 2017) and Ivan (b. 2022)

References

1979 births
Living people
Spouses of prime ministers of Croatia
People from Dubrovnik